Charles Stokes  ( – 28 December 1853) was a London stockbroker who gained a reputation both as an amateur scientist and as an art collector.

Biography
According to the 1851 England Census, Stokes was born in the City of London, Middlesex around 1784. A baptism was recorded at St Andrew's in Holborn, City of London on 9 June 1783 for Charles Stokes, son of John Stokes and Agnes Partridge Stokes of Shoe Lane (off Fleet Street) in the City of London). Upon his death in December 1853, Stokes was widely reported to be in his 70th year (typically meaning aged 69). Stokes was also listed as age 69 when his death was recorded. He seems never to have married.

He is recorded as being a partner in the stockbroking firm of Hodges & Stokes, Threadneedle Street. Between 1835 and 1851, he is recorded as living in Gray's Inn Road, at Verulam Buildings, a housing development which had been designed for the professional classes. His clients included naturalist Charles Darwin, art critic and polymath John Ruskin, and artist J. M. W. Turner.

Although his scientific interests ranged widely, his principal ones were geology, malacology (in particular, corals and trilobites), and palaeobotany. In 1808, he was elected Fellow of the Linnean Society; in 1811, both Fellow of the Royal Geographical Society and Fellow of the Society of Antiquaries; and in 1821, Fellow of the Royal Society. Digitisation of 19th century records is incomplete; however, it is known that in 1816 and 1817 he was a secretary of the Geological Society, in 1821 a member of its Council, and at some later date its vice-president. He was also a Member of the Royal Asiatic Society, and a Fellow of the Royal Astronomical Society. In 1838, he was one of the group of eminent scientists who presented a successful petition to Parliament recommending the purchase of two important collections of fossils for the British Museum.

He collected watercolours and old master prints, but the core of his art collection was Turner. In 1853, Anna Matilda Whistler wrote that he had showed her an "extraordinary treat of Turners paintings", not equalled elsewhere, "from the artists first efforts at 16 years, to his meridian" (a metaphor for his highest mastery).

His circle of acquaintance was large and distinguished, and ranged over the arts and the sciences. He knew in person or exchanged letters with: Louis Agassiz (1807–1873), Swiss-American biologist and geologist; Charles Babbage (1791–1871), British computer pioneer; George Back (1796–1878), Royal Navy officer, explorer of the Canadian Arctic, naturalist and artist; Francis Baily (1774–1844), English astronomer; Henry Wolsey Bayfield (1795–1885), Royal Navy officer and surveyor; John Bigsby (1792–1881), English physician and geologist; John Bostock (1773–1846), English physician, scientist and geologist; James Scott Bowerbank (1797–1877), British naturalist and palaeontologist; Arthur de Capell Brooke (1791–1858), British baronet and travel writer; William Broderip (1789–1859), English lawyer and naturalist; Alexandre Brongniart (1770–1847), French chemist, mineralogist, and zoologist; Robert Brown (1773–1858), Scottish botanist and palaeobotanist; William Buckland (1784–1856), English theologian, geologist and palaeontologist; Augustus Wall Callcott (1779–1844), English landscape painter; Francis Leggatt Chantrey (1781–1841), English sculptor; William Clift (1775–1849), British illustrator and conservator; Spencer Compton (1790–1851), British nobleman and patron of science and the arts; George Cumberland (1754–1848), English art collector, writer and poet; Charles Darwin (1809–1882), English naturalist, geologist and biologist; Francis Egerton (1800–1857), British politician, writer, traveller and patron of the arts; Philip Grey Egerton (1806–1881), English palaeontologist and Conservative politician; Hugh Falconer (1808–1865), Scottish geologist, botanist, palaeontologist and paleoanthropologist; Edward Forbes (1815–1854), Manx naturalist; John Franklin (1786–1847), Royal Navy officer and explorer of the Arctic; Francis Seymour Haden (1818–1910), English surgeon and etcher; James Hall (1761–1832), Scottish geologist and geophysicist; William Hamilton (1805–1867), English geologist; Thomas Hawkins (1810–1899), English fossil collector and dealer; Isaac Hays (1796–1879), American ophthalmologist, medical ethicist, and naturalist; William Hilton (1786–1839), English portrait and history painter; Charles Joseph Hullmandel (1789–1850), English lithographer; George Jones (1786–1869), British painter; Edwin Landseer (1802–1873), English painter and sculptor; Isaac Lea (1792–1886), American conchologist, geologist, and publisher; William Elford Leach (1791–1836), English zoologist and marine biologist; the Loddiges family, German-English horticulturalists; William Lonsdale (1794–1871), English geologist and palaeontologist; Charles Lyell (1797–1875), Scottish geologist; George Francis Lyon (1795–1832), Royal Navy officer and explorer; Gideon Mantell (1790–1852), English obstetrician, geologist and palaeontologist; Henri Milne-Edwards (1800–1885), French zoologist; Roderick Murchison (1792–1871), British geologist; Richard Owen (1804–1892), English biologist, comparative anatomist and palaeontologist; Edward Parry (1790–1855), Royal Navy officer was an English rear-admiral and Arctic explorer; Joseph Barclay Pentland (1797–1873), Irish geographer, natural scientist, and traveller; John Phillips (1800–1874), English geologist; David Ricardo (1772–1823), British political economist; Peter Mark Roget (1779–1869), British physician, natural theologian and lexicographer; James Ross (1800–1862), Royal Navy officer and Antarctic explorer; John Ruskin (1819–1900), English art critic and polymath; Adam Sedgwick (1785–1873), British priest and geologist; George Brettingham Sowerby (1788–1854), British naturalist, illustrator and conchologist; Edward Stanley (1779–1849), bishop of Norwich, president of the Linnean Society; Samuel Stutchbury (1798–1859), English naturalist and geologist; John Taylor (1779–1863), British mining engineer; John Vaughan Thompson (1779–1847), British military surgeon, marine biologist, zoologist and botanist; Wilhelm Gottlieb Tilesius von Tilenau (1769–1857), German naturalist and explorer, physician, draftsman and engraver; J. M. W. Turner (1775–1851), English Romantic painter, printmaker and watercolourist; William Whewell (1794–1866), English polymath, scientist, Anglican priest, philosopher, theologian and historian of science; Joseph Whidbey (1757–1833), Royal Navy explorer and engineer; Anna Matilda Whistler (1804–1881), best known as the subject of the painting Arrangement in Grey and Black No.1 ("Whistler's Mother") by James McNeill Whistler; Henry Witham (1779–1844), English researcher into the internal structure of fossil plants; and William Wollaston (1766–1828), English chemist and physicist.

He had become acquainted with Darwin before the latter embarked in 1831 on the voyage in HMS Beagle which made his name, and had asked him to collect information on Fungia, a genus of coral; which Darwin did. As a footnote to history, in 1842 Darwin thanked Stokes for the recent loan of his snuffbox.

The library of the Royal College of Music preserves several musical compositions, analyses, and collections dated between 1831 and 1847 attributed to a Charles Stokes. IMSLP has a record of a Charles Stokes, who was a composer. However, IMSLP says that that man was born in 1784 (which is consistent with other records about the scientist and art collector) and died on 14 April 1839 (which is not). It is unclear whether those two musicians were the same or different, and whether one or both may have been the man who is the subject of this article.

Lyell called Stokes "a respected member of the Stock Exchange, full of vast research in the Natural History Sciences, and remarkable for literary and antiquarian, musical and artistic, knowledge". Darwin called him "a stockbroker of repute & an old friend of mine", and (after Stokes' death) "one whom I long trusted". In his presidential address at the annual general meeting of the Geological Society on 17 February 1854, Edward Forbes said: 

In an address to the Royal Geographical Society on 22 May 1854, the Earl of Ellesmere, its then President, said: 
In May and June 1854, Sotheby's sold off Stokes' library and his scientific collections in separate dedicated auctions; which suggests that both were of substantial size. It is unclear what became of his art collection; but it is known that some of his Turner watercolours passed to his niece, Hannah Smith; because Ruskin bought ten of them from her in 1858. In November 1854, the Royal Society did no more than note the fact that Stokes had died.

Taxa described
He described the following taxa:
 Actinoceras bigsbii, A. lyonii and A. simmsii (Stokes 1840), three species of extinct cephalopods in genus Actinoceras 
 Asaphus platycephalus (Stokes 1824), an extinct species of trilobite in genus Asaphus 
 Caryophyllia smithii (Stokes & Broderip 1828), a species of solitary coral 
 Huronia (Stokes 1824), an extinct genus of cephalopods 
 Ormoceras {Stokes 1840), an extinct genus of cephalopods 

In a letter of 1846 to Royal Navy Captain Sir James Ross, Stokes described two species which Ross had dredged from Antarctic waters: Hornera lateralis (genus Hornera, a Bryozoan, in family Horneridae, in suborder Cancellata); and Primnoa rossii (genus Primnoa, a soft coral). However, it seems that neither description was ever formally published, and that neither name was ever accepted. It is unclear as to what those species (which may or may not have been elsewhere described and named) might be.

Taxa named in honour
It has long been customary for zoologists when describing a new taxon to explain why they have chosen a name for a genus or an epithet for a species. Several species with the epithet stokesi or stokesii may have been named in honour of Charles Stokes. All the species listed in this section were described by his contemporaries, often by people who he is known to have known, and all were within his areas of interest. In every case, it would be necessary to consult the original scientific papers to be sure.

This attribution is certain:

 Hemicidaris stokesii (Wright 1857), an extinct sea urchin in genus Hemicidaris 

These attributions seem plausible:

 Acinophyllum stokesi (Milne-Edwards & Haime 1851 = Columnaria stokesi Milne-Edwards & Haime not 1906, Diphyphyllum stokesi Milne-Edwards & Haime not 1897, Lithostrotion stokesi Milne-Edwards & Haime 1858), Palaeophyllum stokesi Milne-Edwards & Haime 1851) 
 Dichocoenia stokesi (Milne-Edwards & Haime 1848), a stony coral
 Goniopora stokesi (Milne-Edwards & Haime 1851), a colonial stony coral
 Mellitella stokesii (Agassiz 1841 = Echinoglycus stokesii Agassiz 1841, Encope stokesii Agassiz 1841, Mellita stokesii Agassiz 1841), a sea urchin in genus Mellitella in family Mellitidae in suborder  in order Clypeasteroida
 Notopocorystes stokesii (Mantell 1844 = Corystes stokesii, Palaeocorystes stokesii), an extinct crab in genus Notopocorystes in family Raninidae
 Phacops stokesii (Milne-Edwards 1851 ?= Calymene macrophthalama Murchison), a trilobite; assigned both to Phacops and to Calymene, genus uncertain 
 Platytrochus stokesii (Milne-Edwards & Haime 1848 = Turbiniola stokesii Lea 1833)), an extinct stony coral 
 Proetus stokesi (Murchison n.d.), a trilobite 
 Proetus stokesii (Murchison 1839 = Asaphus stokesii Murchison 1839, Forbesia stokesii M'Coy 1855), a trilobite 
 Trigonotreta stokesi (Koenig 1825 = Spirifer stokesii, Spiriferina stokesi), an extinct articulate brachiopod 
 Warburgella stokesii (Murchison 1839 ?=Proetus stokesi Reed n.d.), a trilobite 
 Zaphrentis stokesi (Milne-Edwards & Haime 1851), an extinct coral in genus Zaphrentis possibly in order Rugosa

Places named in honour

In 1826, Royal Navy captain and explorer John Franklin named Point Stokes, a headland in Yukon in the Arctic Sea, in Stokes' honour.

It is not clear why Stokes Mountain and Stokes Range in Nunavut, Canada were so named. They may or may not have been named in honour of Charles Stokes.

Publications

Notes

References

Year of birth uncertain
1780s births
1853 deaths
English art collectors
19th-century British geologists
English malacologists
English palaeontologists
Amateur paleontologists
Paleobotanists
English stockbrokers
Fellows of the Geological Society of London
Fellows of the Linnean Society of London
Fellows of the Royal Astronomical Society
Fellows of the Royal Geographical Society
Fellows of the Royal Society
Fellows of the Society of Antiquaries of London
19th-century British businesspeople